Columbia Street may refer to:

A prominent street in Downtown New Westminster, British Columbia
A section of Avenue D in Manhattan, New York

See also